Animal Production and Health Commission for Asia and the Pacific (APHCAP) was formed by International treaty in Rome, 22 June 1973 originally through an Agreement for the Establishment of a Regional Animal Production and Health Commission for Asia, the Far East and the South-West Pacific. The purpose was the promotion of livestock development in general and national and international research and action with respect to animal health and husbandry problems in Asia, and Far East and the South-West Pacific. It was established within the framework of the Food and Agriculture Organization.

The current 19 member states are:

References

Treaties of Australia
Treaties of Bangladesh
Treaties of Bhutan
Treaties of India
Treaties of Indonesia
Treaties of Iran
Treaties of South Korea
Treaties of Laos
Treaties of Malaysia
Treaties of Mongolia
Treaties of Myanmar
Treaties of Nepal
Treaties of Pakistan
Treaties of Papua New Guinea
Treaties of the Philippines
Treaties of Samoa
Treaties of Sri Lanka
Treaties of Thailand
International organizations based in Thailand
Intergovernmental organizations established by treaty